Giyani Community Radio station (106mhz-FM)(Giyani Community Radio station) is an Organization and a community radio station established by Greater Giyani community. It is located at the town of Giyani under the Greater Giyani Local Municipality. The station has a 50 km broadcasting radius which covers the following areas:Greater Giyani Local Municipalityarea, Vhembe District and Mopani District Municipality, Mutale Local Municipality, North of Kruger National Park on the eastern side and Makhado Local Municipality the South, Southern, Eastern, Western and Northern parts.

History GCR-FM 
The station broadcasts in Xitsonga 50%, English 10%, Tshivenda 20%, and Northern Sotho 20%. The GCR is created by collective community and civil society calling for more rigorous community participation corporate governance unheard of nationally. GCR was formed recently with the aim of providing exciting state of community radio. GCR is a community radio station that broadcast 24/7 on the 106 FM frequencies. It aired by July 2013.
GCR was formed recently with the aim of providing exciting state of community radio. GCR will provide its services to the surrounding communities and general publicly contributes to community development, by addressing community, national and global issues, challenges and opportunities. The station ensures that individuals in these communities have access to knowledge that empowers them to live lives that are based on fundamental human values. GCR showcase a unique community radio model of civil society leadership in terms of corporate governance and community broadcasting service.

Coverage & Frequencies

Listenership Figures

Target Audience 

 Age group 16 – 24 (43%
 Age group 25 – 34 (20%)
 Age group 35 – 49 (21%)
 Female (50%
 Male (50%)
 LSM 1-5 (46.6%)
 LSM 6-10 (10.9%)

Broadcast time 

 24/7

GCR line Up Programs

Monday to Friday 

 From 06:00-09:00 Big Breakfast Zone (BBZ) by Big Change & Xiluva
 From 09:00-12:00 MID-morning Drive by Ntwanano Vuma
 From 12:00-15:00 GCR TALK by Hlawulani Mabasa 
 From 15:00-18:00 BUMPER RELOADED  by Don & Lady Vee
 From 18:00-19:00 TA MIGANGA by Lunghile
 From 19:00-20:00 SPORT VILL by Tonny waka Khosa 
 From 20:00-22:00 A HI CHONGOLENI by MK Mathonsi
 From 22:00-00:00 TALE MBILWINI by The Junior
 From 00:00-03:00 Xintshuxo by Star Dzunie
 From 03:00-06:00 MORNING BIRDS by MK Mathonsi

GCR Saturdays Program 

 FROM 06:00-09:00 WEEKEND BREAKFAST by MissK
 FROM 09:00-12:00 XITSONG TOP 20 BY Inspector Bizo
 FROM 12:00-15:00 REGGAE SPECIAL By The Jnr
 FROM 15:00-16:00 JAZZ BEAT by Bligh
 FROM 18:00-21:00 HOUSE TOP 20 by Inspector Bizo
 FROM 21:00-00:00 TA XIGAZA Mhlengwe
 FROM 00:00-03:00 Ziyawa By Bligh
 FROM 03:00-06:00 MORNING BIRDS by Sunday Kubayi

GCR Sunday Program 

 06:00-09:00 PRAISE & WORSHIP by Ntwanano Vuma
 09:00-10:00 AWARA YA NTIYISO by Pastor James
 10:00-13:00 CHURCH SERVICE by Ntsaki Nwa Honwani
 13:00-15:00 RELIGIOUS TALK by Sunday
 15:00-18:00 XITSONGA GOSPEL REVIVAL BY Stardzun
 18:00-19:00 AWARA YA KUTSHUXIWA BY  Pastors
 19:00-21:00 REASONING FROM BIBLE BY Bligh
 21:00-00:00 GOSPEL TOP 20 BY Sunday Kubayi
 00:00-03:00 ZIYAWA by Bligh
 03:00-06:00 MORNING BIRDS BY Sunday

References

External links 

Community radio stations in South Africa
Radio stations established in 2013
Mopani District Municipality
Mass media in Limpopo